Arctander is the name of two Norwegian families: one from Trondheim and a Nordland family.

History
The family Arctander in Trondheim descends from Niels Lauritzen the elder (b. ca. 1490), Mayor of Trondheim. His grandchildren, among them Niels Lauritzen the younger, who was a bishop in Viborg, Denmark, adopted the name Arctander.

The Nordland family Arctander begins with Peder Pedersen (b. ca. 1626), a farmer in Lødingen, Nordland. His grandson, Aron Pedersen, adopted the name Arctander when attending the University in Copenhagen, whereafter he returned to Norway and became a priest in Ofoten. Many prominent people belong to this family, among them cabinet minister Sofus Arctander, cand.oecon. Signy Arctander, and Evan Arctander, a Board Certified safety professional and Safety engineer.

Name
The name is in Latinised Greek and means "Norwegian". The first part means arctic, and the second part derives from the word andros (man), i.e. "north man".

References

Norwegian families